Anna-Teodora (13th century) was a Bulgarian princess, the daughter of emperor Ivan Asen II (r. 1218–41) and Irene Komnene. She sprung from her father's third marriage, and was born between 1238 and 1241. Through her mother, Anna-Theodora was a granddaughter of titular Byzantine emperor Theodore Komnenos Doukas (d. 1253).

Anna-Teodora married the sebastokrator Peter. They had a daughter, who married despotes Shishman of Vidin and founded the Shishman branch of the Asen dynasty. She was the grandmother of emperor Michael Shishman of Bulgaria and great-grandmother of emperor Ivan Alexander of Bulgaria.

References

External links 
 България пред залез: 1300-1393/1396

13th-century births
13th-century deaths
13th-century Bulgarian people
Bulgarian princesses
Year of birth unknown
Year of death unknown
Asen dynasty
13th-century Bulgarian women
Daughters of emperors